Thierry Marignac (born 1958 in Paris) is a French writer and journalist.

Biography
Marignac was married to Natalya Medvedeva in 1985. In a column composed shortly after her death, Marignac wrote that the marriage had been enacted in order to allow Medvedeva to remain in Paris.

In another column, Marignac recounts his youth and his growing aversion to politics:

I was born with that indifference, like my old school friends. We belonged to a generation born between '55 and '62, between a rock and a hard place; we had seen our older brothers shift all gears from the idealism of the 68 firebrands to the sated greed of overfed businessmen in the 80's. On the other hand, we had also been witnesses to the twilight of Giscard Gaullism in the 7O's, cynical, corrupted, and dumber by the minute, a withered, musty, curdled France. The choke-hold on culture engineered by the Left during its long conquest of the media in the 70's left few options: either join ranks with the likes of Le Figaro, submitting to good manners, wealthy families and try to charm the reactionaries, or bow to the former Leftists' values, swear allegiance to the humanitarian principles that had already been used as excuses to so many massacres, and good old bourgeois methods of screening and keeping the niggers down. The baby-boomers were masters at playing the competition between generations, and made sure that the one following immediately, who had witnessed their treachery against their old ideals, would be silenced from the start. On the other side of the spectrum, the reactionaries went on ruling their turf with their own brand of cooptation, relying on a shrinking but still comfortable accumulated capital.

Marignac is a former amateur boxer and is an avid boxing fan, which is partly reflected in his novel Renegade Boxing Club.

Bibliography

Novels
Fasciste, éditions Payot, 1988, reprint Hélios noir, 2016, 
Cargaison, éditions du Rocher, 1992, 
Milana, éditions Fleuve Noir, 1996 
Fuyards, éditions Rivages/Noir, 2003, 
À Quai, éditions Rivages/Noir, 2006,  
Renegade Boxing Club, Éditions Gallimard, Série noire, 2009,  
Milieu hostile, éditions Baleine, 2011,  
Morphine Monojet, éditions du Rocher, 2016, 
 Cargo sobre, éditions Vagabonde, 2016

Short stories 
9’79, éditions DTV, collection compact-livres, 1989,  
Scratch, éditions DTV, collection compact-livres, 1994
Le pays où la mort est moins chère, dans l’anthologie Pollutions, éditions Fleuve Noir, 1999,  
Maudit soit l'éternel, suivi de Dieu n'a pas que ça à foutre, éditions Les Trois Souhaits, Actus-SF, 2008, 
Le pays où la mort est moins chère, recueil de nouvelles, éditions Moisson Rouge, 2009,

Document 
Vint, le roman noir des drogues en Ukraine, éditions Payot Documents, 2006.

Essais 
Norman Mailer, économie du machisme, éditions Le Rocher, collection "Les Infréquentables", 1990.
Des chansons pour les sirènes, Essenine, Tchoudakov, Medvedeva, Saltimbanques russes du XXe siècle (in collaboration with Kira Sapguir), 2012
De la traduction littéraire comme stupéfiant, fascicule-revue DTV-Exotic, 2002. Read online

References

External links 
 Benoît Laudier (vagabonde) et Thierry Marignac : Affinités électives et autres coïncidences
 Antifixion, blog littéraire de l'auteur

Writers from Paris
1958 births
Living people
20th-century French novelists
21st-century French novelists
French male short story writers
French short story writers
20th-century French male writers
21st-century French male writers